Valentino: The Last Emperor is a 2008 documentary film about the life of Valentino Garavani. It was produced and directed by Matt Tyrnauer, Special Correspondent for Vanity Fair magazine. The film is an exploration of the singular world of one of Italy's most famous men, Valentino Garavani. The film documents the dramatic closing act of Valentino's career, tells the story of his life, and explores the larger themes affecting the fashion business. At the heart of the film is the relationship between Valentino and his business partner and companion of 50 years, Giancarlo Giammetti.

Production 
In production from June 2005 to July 2007, the filmmakers shot over 250 hours of footage with exclusive access to Valentino and his entourage. “We were let in to the inner circle, but we had to stick it out for a long time, practically move in, to capture the truly great moments,” says Tyrnauer. “Valentino is surrounded by a tight-knit family of friends and employees, but, eventually, their guard came down and they forgot there was a camera crew in the room.”

”Valentino was one of the first designers to make himself the inspirational figure at the center of the story he was telling,” says Tyrnauer. “He is a born dreamer and the last true couturier, who let us in on his creative process and also let us in on the life he built around him to sustain this process,” adds Tyrnauer. “He lives as lavishly as his clients and set a standard for the industry. He shuts out all that is not beautiful, and we followed him around the world to capture that special world.”

Release 
Shot in widescreen high-definition, Valentino The Last Emperor premiered at film festivals beginning in August 2008, with gala premiere parties and special events.

Valentino The Last Emperor had its world premiere at the 2008 Venice International Film Festival and its North American Premiere at the 2008 Toronto International Film Festival. In March 2009, Valentino The Last Emperor was released theatrically in New York. The film was called by Indiewire the highest grossing documentary debut of 2009.
Throughout April, the film opened theatrically in U.S cities.

References

External links 
 
 

2008 documentary films
2008 films
2008 in fashion
American documentary films
Documentary films about fashion designers
Films scored by Nino Rota
2000s French-language films
2000s Italian-language films
Films directed by Matt Tyrnauer
Valentino (fashion house)
2000s English-language films
2000s American films
Films about companies